Hojjat Haghverdi (born 3 February 1993) is a professional footballer who plays as a defender for Neftçi. Born in Iran, he represents the Azerbaijan national team.

Club career

Aboomoslem
He joined Aboomoslem U21 in summer 2014 and was directly promoted to the first team. He made four appearances in the 2013–14 Azadegan League.

Zob Ahan
Haghverdi joined Zob Ahan in summer 2014 with a 3-year contract. He made his debut for Zob Ahan on 12 September 2014 against Paykan as a starter.

Sumgayit
On 12 January 2021, Sumgayit announced the signing of Haghverdi. On 16 June 2021, Haghverdi signed a new two-year contract with Sumgayit.

Club career statistics

International career

Iran U23
He was invited to Iran U-23 training camp by Nelo Vingada to preparation for Incheon 2014 and 2016 AFC U-22 Championship (Summer Olympic qualification).

Azerbaijan
He made his debut for Azerbaijan national football team on 2 June 2021 in a friendly against Belarus.

International goals

Honours

Club
Zob Ahan
Hazfi Cup (2): 2014–15, 2015–16
Iranian Super Cup (1): 2016

References

External links 
 Hojjat Haghverdi at IranLeague.ir
 Hojjat Haghverdi at Telegram
 Hojjat Haghverdi at PersianLeague.com

1993 births
Living people
Sportspeople from Mashhad
Citizens of Azerbaijan through descent
Azerbaijani footballers
Azerbaijan international footballers
Iranian footballers
Azerbaijani people of Iranian descent
Sportspeople of Iranian descent
Association football central defenders
F.C. Aboomoslem players
Zob Ahan Esfahan F.C. players
Paykan F.C. players
Sumgayit FK players
Tractor S.C. players
Neftçi PFK players
Persian Gulf Pro League players
Azerbaijan Premier League players